Guy-André-Pierre de Montmorency-Laval (21 September 1723, château de Bayers - 22 September 1798, Paris), 1st duke of Laval, first baron of Marche, marquis de Lezay was a French general and marshal of France. He was the brother of Louis-Joseph de Montmorency-Laval, cardinal-bishop of Metz.

Life
Initially styled the marquis of Laval, he joined the musketeers on 1 January 1741, serving in the Flanders campaign in 1742. On 4 April 1743 he bought a commission to command a cavalry company in the régiment de Royal-Pologne. On 27 June 1743 he fought at Dettingen and on 22 August that year was commissioned as colonel of an infantry regiment that was renamed after him. In 1744 he was present at the capture of Wissembourg and of the Loutre lines, at the attack on the trenches at Suffelsheim and the siege of Fribourg. He took part in the capture of Cronenbourg in March 1745. He joined the French army in Flanders, taking part in the regiment

External links
 

1723 births
1798 deaths
Marshals of France